A Basty or Bastı (Azerbaijani: Basdı) is an evil spirit or goblin in Turkic mythology which rides on people's chests while they sleep, bringing on bad dreams (or nightmares).

Beliefs
The Basty was also believed to "ride" horses, which left them exhausted and covered in sweat by the morning. 
Basty included witches who took on the form of animals when their spirits went out while they were in trance. Animals such as frogs, cats, horses, hares, dogs, oxen, birds and often bees and wasps. In their metamorphosed form they could fly through the night, walk on or hover above water and travel in a sieve. Dead basty witches were said to return as ghosts.

Basty was a dark spirit that takes a form of a beautiful woman and then visits men in their dreams, torturing them with desire, and dragging life out of them. It is a common belief that basty enters the room through the keyhole, sits on the chest of the sleepers and tries to strangle them .

Folklore
Its victims are often females, whom it attacks during the night, controlling their dreams and creating horrible nightmares (hence the Turkic word Kara-basty ("black pressure", meaning a nightmare). A Basty attack is called Karabasan. Karabasan is when an Basty sits astride a sleeper's chest and becomes heavier until the crushing weight awakens the terrified and breathless dreamer. The victim awakes unable to move under the Bastys weight. It may also include lucid dreams. There are different types of Basty in Anatolia: Al-Basty, Kara-Basty, Kul-Basty, Sary-Basty ...

Al-basty: It is a tall, white-skinned and evil, naked female creature. 
Kara-basty: It is a nightmare daemon.
Qul-basty: It sleeps during the day in his grave and travels at night. Portrayed as a hairy and smelly.
Sary-basty: It is a woman dressed in yellow. Makes epilepsy disease.

Characteristics
Basty  is best known for its shapeshifting abilities, similar to the creatures from werewolf lore. It may change into a cat, dog, snake or a fox. It has also been said that it can fly like a bird and ride a horse. Protections against an alp include laying a knife under a pillow, or iron things. Steel is  also used.

References

External links 
 Türk Mitoloji Sözlüğü, Pınar Karaca (Bastırık)

See also
 Hag in folklore
 Mare (folklore)
 Mora (mythology)
 Moroi (folklore)

Deities and spirits
Goblins
Turkic demons
Turkish folklore